Shwe Hpyin Naungdaw, also called Shwe Hpyin Gyi or Min Gyi, is one of the 37 nats in the official pantheon of Burmese nats. He is the elder brother of Shwe Hpyin Nyidaw and the son of Popa Medaw, another nat. Worshippers of this nat avoid consumption of pork, as Shwe Hpyin Gyi's father, Byatta, is believed to have been an Indian Muslim.

References

25